Photos  is an image viewer and image organizer developed by Microsoft. It was first included in Windows 8 as a functional replacement for Windows Photo Viewer and Windows Photo Gallery.

Photo management

Photos is a single-instance app that can organize digital photos in its gallery into albums. The default view is Collection, which is sorted by date. Users can also view items by Album or Folder. The album view shows both auto-generated and user-generated albums. The folder view displays files based on their location in the file system or on OneDrive. Users can choose what folders are displayed and which files are placed in albums.

Photo editing
Photos provides the following basic raster graphics editor functions:
 Crop and rotate
 Correct exposure or colors
 Reduce image noise

Users can edit with a sidebar similar to the one in Google Photos, which allows them to adjust the photo's shadows, highlights, sharpness, and filters. Further, Photos also allows users to trim, slow down, and save photos from videos.

Unlike Photo Gallery, which autosaves edits, Photos only saves when a user clicks the Save or Save As button. Photos allows users to compare the original file to the file with unsaved changes, and to save the photo with a different name and location.

Video Editor

Video Editor (formerly Story Remix) is a video editing feature built into the Photos app. Intended to replace the older Windows Movie Maker, this feature was added to Microsoft Photos with the Fall Creators Update to Windows 10. Video Editor uses AI and to organize and transform photos and videos into stories. Video Editor allowed users to create videos from pictures and songs. It also contained features to add 3D effects, soundtracks, 3D animations, and styles to the videos.

The video editor was removed from the Windows 11 version of Photos, being replaced by the separate app Clipchamp.

Photo and video import
The Photos app's photo and video import tool provides the ability to view and select photos that are automatically grouped by date taken and choose where the files are saved.

The Photos app can show individual pictures, display all pictures in a folder as a slide show, reorient them in 90° increments or through a granular control, print them either directly or via an online print service, send them in e-mail or save them to a folder or disc. It supports images in Animated GIF, BMP, JPEG, JPEG XR (formerly HD Photo), PNG, ICO, RAW, PANO, and TIFF file formats. It can also view HEIF images with the HEIF Image Extensions app from the Microsoft Store.

History 
Photos is built from a separate code base from those of Photo Gallery and Windows Photo Viewer. It was first included in Windows 8.0 and had a customizable background and a Facebook photo viewer, both of which were removed in the Windows 8.1 update to the app. It also introduced the ability to view immersive photo PANO files and set a photo as the app's live tile or the Windows lock screen. Like most other apps designed for Windows 8, the controls were hidden until the user right-clicks on the screen.

In Windows 10, Photos originally used a hamburger menu for the photo management interface and to make basic controls visible to users. Unlike most Microsoft apps designed specifically for Windows 10, Photos used round buttons like the ones on Windows 8 for editing. Control categories were listed as buttons on the left side of the app, and specific editing options were listed as buttons on the right side of the app. Folder view and the ability for users to edit albums were added to the app after the initial release on Windows 10 in response to user feedback. Photos includes all features from Windows Photo Viewer except the Burn to Disc feature and may gain more features from Photo Gallery in the future. The original view exclusively featured a dark theme.

A major update in October 2016 replaced the hamburger menu with a ribbon, replaced the radial editing tools with an editing sidebar, and added a full-screen view, ink editing for photos and videos, and a light theme.

In 2022, a new version of the Photos app was released for Windows 11 with changes in the user interface matching the design of Windows 11. This version has significantly different photo editing features. Many features were removed, including the video editor, face grouping, and browsing by year. The former Photos app from Windows 10 has been renamed to "Photos Legacy" in Windows 11.

References

External links
 Microsoft Photos on Microsoft Store
 Photos Add-on on Microsoft Store
 Microsoft Photos Legacy on Microsoft Store
 Photos help – Windows Help

Windows components
Image organizers
Photo stitching software
Universal Windows Platform apps
2012 software
Xbox One software
Windows media players
Windows-only freeware
Video editing software for Windows
Photos